The administrative meeting of senators not appearing on the list of any group (abbreviated RASNAG) is the term used since 1976 to refer to the grouping of members of the Senate of France who are not registered (non inscrits) as belonging to any political group. It is not itself a formal parliamentary group, although a group of non-registered members existed from 1968 to 1976, first under the name of the group of non-registered members (groupe des non-inscrits) from 3 October 1968, and later the group of the union of senators not registered with a political group (groupe de l'Union des sénateurs non inscrits à un groupe politique) from 30 June 1971 to 1976, both of which elected their own presidents. Non-inscrits have not always formed a group; in the records of the Journal officiel, such members were listed under the title of senators not registered with a political group (sénateurs non inscrits à un groupe politique) from 1959 to 1960 and 1964 to 1967, as well as under the appellation of senators neither appearing on a list nor associated with a group list (sénateurs ne figurant ni sur une liste ni à la suite d'une liste de groupe) from 1961 to 1963, 1968 to 1969, and in 1973.

Historically, non-inscrits have tended to form a parliamentary group when possible; however, this has often not been feasible because they were too few in number to do so, the current threshold being 10 senators. The administrative meeting therefore elects a delegate who represents it in a manner analogous to that of presidents in other political groups and has certain rights of participation in the allocation of seats in committees and the apportionment between parliamentary groups of membership of the Bureau of the Senate. The group is chaired by Jean-Louis Masson since 6 October 2020.

Current composition

Historical membership

References

External links 
 Lists of senators by political group 
 Historical composition of the Senate and political groups 

Senate (France)
Parliamentary groups in France
Technical parliamentary groups